Wulf Dorn (born 20 April 1969 in Ichenhausen) is a German novelist who writes in the psychological thriller genre. He is best known for his novel Trigger, which was published in 2009.

References

External links
  
 Homepage

1969 births
Living people
21st-century German novelists
21st-century German male writers
People from Günzburg (district)
Writers from Bavaria